The Note of Hand, or Trip to Newmarket is a 1774 comedy play by the British writer Richard Cumberland. A farce it was the final play performed by David Garrick at the Drury Lane Theatre before his retirement. The play mocked some of the leading Whig politicians of the era such as Charles Fox and the  Duke of Devonshire. This may have been the cause of Cumberland's dispute with Richard Brinsley Sheridan who was a Whig. Sheridan went on to create a character closely based on Cumberland in the 1779 play The Critic.

References

Bibliography
 Mudford, William. The Life of Richard Cumberland. Sherwood, Neely & Jones, 1812.
 Nicoll, Allardyce. A History of English Drama 1660-1900. Volume III: Late Eighteenth Century Drama. Cambridge University Press, 1952.

Plays by Richard Cumberland
1774 plays